Crossotus ugandae is a species of beetle in the family Cerambycidae. It was described by Breuning in 1936. It is known from Kenya and Somalia.

References

ugandae
Beetles described in 1936